Chadwick School is a nonsectarian independent K-12 day school located in an unincorporated area on the Palos Verdes Peninsula in Los Angeles County, California, United States. Specifically it is located at the top of the neighborhood referred to as Academy Hill, which is bounded by a canyon, a precipice, Crenshaw Boulevard, and Palos Verdes Drive North.

History
The school was founded in 1935 by Margaret Lee Chadwick and Commander Joseph Chadwick in San Pedro, California. In 1938, the school moved to Palos Verdes, California. In the beginning, Chadwick was an open-air day and boarding school for 75 students. After the retirement of the Chadwick family in 1963, the school created a board of trustees and in 1968 discontinued its boarding program. In 1972, Chadwick joined the Cum Laude Society. Up until the 1970s, the school owned all of the hill leading up to it, which was sold off to establish the school's endowment. Since then, the school has opened more buildings, a gymnasium, and a performing arts center. It is accredited by the Western Association of Schools and Colleges. The movie adaptation of the book Mommie Dearest was filmed at Chadwick in 1981.

Student and faculty profile
Chadwick is divided into three schools: the Village School (K-6), the Middle School (grades 7-8), and the Upper School (grades 9-12). Sixty-three percent of the faculty members held advanced degrees in the 2014-15 school year.

Chadwick International

On January 13, 2010, the school announced that it would be administering and integrating a sister school in South Korea. Chadwick was the third school chosen to administrate the new school after a deal with Vancouver International Primary and Secondary School fell through. Prior to that, the International School Service had submitted plans to run the school but withdrew them. Later in the process, the school's opening was delayed by Chadwick administrators when they failed to submit paperwork on time.

The school is located in the Songdo International City, a city renowned for its efforts to "go green" and is administratively a near replica of Chadwick School in Palos Verdes. Headmaster Ted Hill has stated that the sister school will remain in contact with the originating school through the use of Telepresence equipment supplied by Cisco.

The school opened on September 6, 2010, and completed its first year in June 2011. As of the 2013-14 school year, Chadwick International enrolled 780 students in grades pre-K through 10. Eleventh grade was added in September 2014, and the school graduated its first class in 2015-16. There are now frequent exchanges and visits between the two Chadwick campuses.

Study abroad
In addition to sending students to Chadwick International, Chadwick frequently exchanges students with other schools that participate in the Round Square program. Chadwick students also travel to other schools through additional programs such as ones through the Community Service program.

Sperm whale skull fossil 
On February 5, 2014, a fossil of a sperm whale skull embedded in a boulder of Middle Miocene Era Altamira Shale located on the grounds of Chadwick School was removed to be studied at the L.A. County Natural History Museum. An expert from the museum believed that the skull might be of a previously unknown species. This event was widely covered by Los Angeles area news outlets.

Extracurricular activities

Debate team
Chadwick's debate team was founded in September 2019 and grew to over 30 students in its second year. Chadwick has accrued four team awards in Public Forum Debate tournaments.

Athletics

Chadwick's main rivals are Polytechnic School in Pasadena, California and Flintridge Preparatory School in La Cañada, California.

Chadwick participates in 23 Varsity CIF sports. They include boys' football, tennis, volleyball, waterpolo, basketball, soccer, baseball, golf, and girls' tennis, volleyball, water polo, equestrian, basketball, soccer, golf, lacrosse, softball, and cheerleading. They also include coed cross country, swimming, and track and field.

In 2007, Chadwick reevaluated its image and decided that yellow was not an appropriate school color. It also realized that its athletics logo featured a non-native dolphin. After these realizations, the school designed a new blue, grey, and white logo featuring a native and more aggressive-looking dolphin.

School newspaper 
The school newspaper, The Mainsheet, is published in print and online. Online publication was restarted at the beginning of March 2012.

Intracurricular activities

Robotics
In 2006 members of the high school community started Wicked Wobotics, team 2150, a  FIRST Robotics Competition team. The team won the Judges' choice award at the 2008 FIRST Robotics competition in Las Vegas, Nevada and was ranked sixth after the qualifying rounds. The FRC team was discontinued in 2010. The remaining team focused on the simpler and less expensive VEX Robotics Competition.

In 2011, the school added an optional robotics class to its science curriculum and moved into a larger room previously occupied by the maintenance department.

In 2014, the team had 30 members and had to move to a much larger classroom.

In 2015, the team had 12 students.

Chadwick Robotics also collaborates with the robotics program at the Chadwick International campus in Songdo, South Korea, sharing engineering techniques and innovative strategies for each year's contest.

Notable alumni

Business
 Danese Cooper - computer scientist and open-source advocate, Wikipedia
 Jann Wenner - owner of Rolling Stone magazine

Medical
 David Chadwick - clinical research pediatrician, author, founder of Chadwick Center for Children and Autism Discovery Institute-San Diego, 2019 recipient of Chadwick School Distinguished Alumnus

Entertainment

 Christina Crawford - actor and author of Mommie Dearest
 Peter Davis - winner of an Academy Award for documentary
 Chuck Dukowski - Bass player for 1970s punk rock band Black Flag
 Jessica Gottlieb - author
 Brandon Lee - actor and martial artist, son of Bruce Lee
 Shannon Lee - daughter of Bruce Lee, sister of Brandon Lee
 Mike Lookinland - actor, The Brady Bunch
 Liza Minnelli - winner of the Emmy, Grammy, Academy and Tony Awards
 Aida Mollenkamp - television chef and food writer, Ask Aida and FoodCrafters
 Rick Moses - actor/singer/songwriter
 Maureen Reagan - actor, child of Ronald Reagan
 Pippa Scott - actress
 Robert Towne - screenwriter/director, winner of an Academy Award for the screenplay of Chinatown
 Michael Viner - record and audiobook producer

Literature
 Susan Berman - author and screenwriter
 Eric Puchner - novelist and short story writer
 George Starbuck - poet, winner of the 1983 Lenore Marshall Poetry Prize
 Peter Zuckerman - journalist (The Oregonian) and author

Athletics
 Lindsay Davenport - No. 1 ranked female tennis player
 Christen Press - Professional Soccer player. Two-time World Cup Champion, Olympian, recipient of the 2010 Hermann Trophy.
 Rebecca Smith - Olympic soccer player
 John Thorrington - soccer player

Notable employees
 Margaret Lee Chadwick - School founder and headmistress (1935 to 1963)
 Latario Rachal<ref>"Chadwick football team crushes Saint Joseph", Palos Verdes Peninsula News, October 7, 2010.</ref> - Athletics coach
 Cedric Wright - photography teacher, recruited Ansel Adams to arrange darkroom and photograph school events

In literature

Nonfiction
 Hedy Lamarr: The Most Beautiful Woman in Film by Ruth Barton
 Indigenous: growing up Californian by Cris Mazza
 Mommie Dearest by Christina Crawford
 The Milk of Almonds: Italian American Women Writers on Food and Culture by Edvige Giunta

Fictional Chadwick School novels
 Mandie by Lois Gladys Leppard
 Surviving Chadwick: A Novel by Phillip Wilhite
 THE TRUST: A Secret Society Novel by Tom Dolby
 White Lines'' by Jennifer Banash. Several fictional teachers in the novel share their names with Chadwick faculty. For example, the character Mr. Cass in the novel shares his last name with a Chadwick teacher. Dr. Banash herself taught English at Chadwick.

Filmography

References

External links

 Chadwick School

Private K-12 schools in Los Angeles County, California
Preparatory schools in California
Educational institutions established in 1935
1935 establishments in California